Euristhmus is a genus of eeltail catfishes native to the eastern Indian-western Pacific Oceans around Australia, New Guinea and Indonesia.

Species
There are currently five recognized species in this genus:
 Euristhmus lepturus (Günther, 1864) (Long-tailed catfish)
 Euristhmus microceps (Richardson, 1845) (Smallhead catfish)
 Euristhmus microphthalmus Murdy & Ferraris, 2006
 Euristhmus nudiceps (Günther, 1880) (Naked-headed catfish)
 Euristhmus sandrae Murdy & Ferraris, 2006

E. lepturus is known from Exmouth Gulf, Western Australia to Sydney, New South Wales, and New Guinea, in freshwater, estuarine
and near-shore marine habitats. E. microceps originates from Shark Bay to Broome, Western Australia, in near-shore habitats over soft bottoms. E. nudiceps inhabits near-shore habitats over soft bottoms of Shark Bay, Western Australia to Brisbane, Queensland, Australia, and New Guinea. E. nudiceps is found along coastlines and in estuaries, including freshwater reaches.

Euristhmus species grow to about  TL.

References

Plotosidae
Fish of Australia
Fish of New Guinea
Fish of Indonesia
Marine fish genera
Catfish genera
Taxa named by James Douglas Ogilby